Patryk Stosz (born 15 July 1994) is a Polish professional racing cyclist, who currently rides for UCI Continental team .

Major results

2013
 1st  Mountains classification, Carpathian Couriers Race
 1st  Mountains classification, Course de la Paix Under-23
2014
 1st  Mountains classification, Carpathian Couriers Race
 9th Overall Memorial Grundmanna I Wizowskiego
2015
 2nd Time trial, National Under-23 Road Championships
 9th Overall Carpathian Couriers Race
2016
 1st  Time trial, National Under-23 Road Championships
2017
 7th Overall Dookoła Mazowsza
 8th Korona Kocich Gór
 10th Coupe des Carpathes
2018
 1st  Mountains classification, Tour de Hongrie
 2nd Visegrad 4 Bicycle Race – Kerékpárverseny
 7th Overall Bałtyk–Karkonosze Tour
 10th Memorial Grundmanna I Wizowskiego
2019
 1st Korona Kocich Gór
 Tour of Almaty
1st  Points classification
1st Stage 1
 2nd Overall Course de Solidarność et des Champions Olympiques
 3rd Grand Prix Alanya
 4th Grand Prix Gazipaşa
 4th Visegrad 4 Bicycle Race – GP Polski
 6th Memoriał Andrzeja Trochanowskiego
 7th Overall Szlakiem Grodów Piastowskich
 8th Memoriał Romana Siemińskiego
 9th Overall Bałtyk–Karkonosze Tour
2020
 1st  Overall Tour of Bulgaria
1st Stage 2 
 1st  Mountains classification, Tour de Pologne
 6th Tour Bitwa Warszawska 1920 
 7th Puchar Ministra Obrony Narodowej
2021
 Tour of Romania
1st  Points classification
1st Stages 1 & 5
 1st Stage 2 Tour of Małopolska
 1st Stage 1 Course de Solidarność et des Champions Olympiques
 1st Stage 4 Circuit des Ardennes
 3rd Overall Belgrade–Banja Luka
1st Stage 2
 3rd Puchar Ministra Obrony Narodowej
 4th Overall Okolo Jižních Čech
 4th Poreč Trophy
 7th Overall Szlakiem Grodów Piastowskich
1st Stage 1 
 10th Overall Istrian Spring Trophy
2022
 1st GP Gorenjska
 1st  Points classification, Circuit des Ardennes
 1st Stage 2 Tour of Małopolska
 1st Stage 3a Tour of Bulgaria
 2nd Grand Prix Nasielsk-Serock
 4th Overall In the footsteps of the Romans
 6th Overall Tour of Estonia
 6th Memorial Henryka Łasaka
 7th Overall Course de Solidarność et des Champions Olympiques
1st Stage 4
 7th Grand Prix Wyszków
 10th Umag Trophy
 10th GP Slovenian Istria
2023
 1st Poreč Trophy

References

External links
 

1994 births
Living people
Polish male cyclists
People from Kluczbork
Sportspeople from Opole Voivodeship
21st-century Polish people